

Events 
Johann Sebastian Bach begins to lose his sight.
Carl Heinrich Graun becomes Kapellmeister to Frederick II of Prussia.  Johann Joachim Quantz becomes Frederick's flute teacher.
Ferdinando Bertoni arrives in Bologna where he becomes a pupil of Giovanni Battista Martini.
December 26 – The Teatro Regio (Turin) is inaugurated with a performance of Francesco Feo's opera Arsace.

Classical music 
Thomas Arne – Alfred (masque), including the song, "Rule Britannia"
Carl Philipp Emanuel Bach  
Concerto for 2 Harpsichords in F major, H.408
Harpsichord Concerto in A major, H.410
Flute Sonata in A minor, H.555
 Christoph Graupner – Violin Sonata in G minor, GWV 711
George Frideric Handel – L'Allegro, il Penseroso ed il Moderato, HWV 55
Giuseppe Tartini – Violin Concerto in C major, D.1
Georg Philipp Telemann – 6 Overtures for Clavier, TWV 32:5–10 (Published ca. 1742 in Nuremberg, as VI Ouverturen nebst zween Folgesätzen)

Opera
Bernardo Aliprandi – Semiramide riconosciuta
Vincenzo Legrenzio Ciampi – La Beatrice
Baldassare Galuppi – Gustavo primo re di Svezia
Maurice Greene – The Judgement of Hercules
George Frideric Handel – Imeneo, HWV 41 (first performed, composed in 1738)
Nicola Porpora – Il trionfo di Camilla
Luca Antonio Predieri – Zenobia

Publications 

 Thomas Arne – Comus (London: William Smith). First performed 1738.
 Jean-Baptiste Barrière – 6 Cello Sonatas, Livre 4 (Paris: Composer) (Likely composed 1737–1740)
Michel Blavet – 6 Flute Sonatas, Op. 3
Louis de Caix d'Hervelois – Pièces de viole, Livre 4
Esprit Philippe Chédeville – 6 Sonatilles galantes, Op. 6
Nicolas Chédeville – Les Deffis ou l'étude amusante, Op. 9
Antoine Dauvergne 
6 Trio Sonatas, Op. 1
12 Violin Sonatas, Op. 2
 Michel Richard Delalande – Noëls en Trio avec un Carillon, S.173.24 (composed 1725, published posthumously)
 George Frideric Handel 
 Op. 6, 12 Concerti Grossi 
 "A Second Set of Six Concertos" (London: John Walsh) (arranged for organ, No. 3–6 are also in Op. 6)  
 James Oswald – A Curious Collection of Scots Tunes
 Johan Helmich Roman – Assaggio in G minor, BeRI 314 (Stockholm: Composer) likely composed earlier.
Carlo Tessarini – 6 Allettamenti da camera, Op. 3 (there is another Op. 3 by Tessarini, a set of 10 violin concerti)
 Antonio Vivaldi – 6 Cello Sonatas, Le Clerc Op. 14 (Paris: Le Clerc le Cadet)
 Unico Wilhelm van Wassenaer – Concerti Armonici (composed between 1725–1740, originally published anonymously and attributed to various composers)

Methods and theory writings 

 Michel Corrette – Méthode pour apprendre à jouër la flûtte
 John Frederick Lampe – The Art of Musick
 Johann Mattheson – Grundlage einer Ehren-Pforte

Births 
February 3 – Guillaume Lasceux (died 1831)
February 4 – Carl Michael Bellman, poet and composer (died 1795)
February 15 – Ernst Eichner (died 1777)
May 9 – Giovanni Paisiello, composer (died 1816)
July 26 – Louis-Augustin Richer, classical singer, singing master and composer (died 1819)
August 10 – Samuel Arnold (composer), (died 1802)
October 7 – Samuel Webbe (died 1816)
 November 4 – Augustus Montague Toplady, hymn-writer (died 1778)
 December – Elisabeth Olin, operatic soprano (died 1828)
 unknown date
John Antes, composer (died 1811)
Sir Peter Beckford, English peer (died 1811), patron of Muzio Clementi
Samuel Webbe, composer (died 1816)
probable – Anna Bon, singer and composer

Deaths 
January 5 – Antonio Lotti, composer (born 1667)
January 13 – William Turner, singer and composer (born 1651)
January 25 – Geminiano Giacomelli, composer (born 1692)
February 9 – Vincent Lübeck, organist and composer (born 1654)
February 25 – Dietrich Bernhard Ludewig (born 1707)
October 14 – Domenico Alberti, composer (born c.1710)
unknown date 
André Bouys, painter and copyist (born c.1656)
Edward Purcell, organist (born 1689)
Poul Christian Schindler, composer (born 1648)
probable – François Dieupart, French composer (born after 1667) 

 
18th century in music
Music by year